Kazincbarcika Subregion Borsod-Abaúj-Zemplén third largest of the subregions of Hungary, with an area of 499.3 square kilometres and population of 60,332 in 2009.

Settlements
 Alsószuha
 Alsótelekes
 Bánhorváti
 Berente
 Dédestapolcsány
 Dövény
 Felsőkelecsény
 Felsőnyárád
 Felsőtelekes
 Imola
 Izsófalva
 Jákfalva
 Kánó
 Kazincbarcika
 Kurityán
 Mályinka
 Múcsony
 Nagybarca
 Ormosbánya
 Ragály
 Rudabánya
 Rudolftelep
 Sajógalgóc
 Sajóivánka
 Sajókaza
 Szuhafő
 Szuhakálló
 Tardona
 Trizs
 Vadna
 Zádorfalva
 Zubogy

See also
Kazincbarcika District (from 2013)

References 

Subregions of Hungary